Operation Lightning may refer to one of the following military operations:
A full-scale amphibious landing by the 74th Indian Brigade of the British Indian Army and the 3rd Commando Brigade of the British Army in Burma during the Second World War.  
 Operation Barak (lit. lightning), a Jewish operation in the 1947–1948 Palestine War
 A coalition counter-insurgency operation in Baghdad in the Iraq War (see List of coalition military operations of the Iraq War)